Shoukat Ali Laleka is a Pakistani politician who was the Provincial  Minister of Punjab for Zakat and Ushr , in office from 13 September 2018 till April 2022. He had been a member of the Provincial Assembly of the Punjab from August 2018 till January 2023.

Previously he was a Member of the Provincial Assembly of the Punjab  from May 2013 to May 2018.

Early life
He was born on 1 January 1961 in Bahawalnagar.

Political career
He was elected to the Provincial Assembly of the Punjab as a candidate of Islami Jamhoori Ittehad (IJI) from Constituency PP-226 (Bahawalnagar-II) in 1990 Pakistani general election. He received 21,077 votes and defeated an independent candidate, Muhammad Tariq Amin Hotiana.

He ran for the seat of the Provincial Assembly of the Punjab as an independent candidate from Constituency PP-226 (Bahawalnagar-II) in 1993 Pakistani general election but was unsuccessful. He received 37 votes and lost the seat to Noor Muhammad Ghaffari, a candidate of Pakistan Muslim League (N) (PML-N). In the same election, he ran for the seat of the National Assembly of Pakistan as an independent candidate from Constituency NA-144 (Bahawalnagar-I) but was unsuccessful. He received 502 votes and lost the seat to Mian Abdul Sattar Laleka, a candidate of PML-N.

He was re-elected to the Provincial Assembly of the Punjab as a candidate of PML-N from Constituency PP-226 (Bahawalnagar-II) in 1997 Pakistani general election. He received 27,467 votes and defeated Mian Manzoor Ahmed Mohal, a candidate of Pakistan Peoples Party (PPP).

He was re-elected to the Provincial Assembly of the Punjab as a candidate of PML-N from Constituency PP-278 (Bahawalnagar-II) in 2013 Pakistani general election. He received 38,673 votes and defeated Syed Nazar Mehmood Shah, an independent candidate.

He was re-elected to Provincial Assembly of the Punjab as an independent candidate from Constituency PP-238 (Bahawalnagar-II) in 2018 Pakistani general election.

He joined Pakistan Tehreek-e-Insaf (PTI) following 2018 election.

On 12 September 2018, he was inducted into the provincial Punjab cabinet of Chief Minister Sardar Usman Buzdar. On 13 September 2018, he was appointed as Provincial Minister of Punjab for Zakat and Ushr.

References

Living people
Punjab MPAs 2013–2018
1961 births
Pakistan Muslim League (N) MPAs (Punjab)
Pakistan Tehreek-e-Insaf MPAs (Punjab)
Punjab MPAs 2018–2023
Provincial ministers of Punjab
Punjab MPAs 1990–1993
Punjab MPAs 1997–1999